The 1967 Women's Western Open was contested from August 17–20 at Pekin Country Club. It was the 38th edition of the Women's Western Open.

This event was won by Kathy Whitworth.

Final leaderboard

External links
The Milwaukee Sentinel source

Women's Western Open
Golf in Illinois
Pekin, Illinois
Women's Western Open
Women's Western Open
Women's Western Open
Women's Western Open
Women's sports in Illinois